Kalpesh Patel may refer to:
Kalpesh Patel (Kenyan cricketer)
Kalpesh Patel (Indian cricketer)